Phoenix buildings may refer to:
 List of tallest buildings in Phoenix, USA
 Phoenix Buildings, Woolloongabba, heritage-listed commercial buildings in Brisbane, Queensland, Australia